Ribeira de Piquín is a town located in the province of Lugo, Galicia, northwestern Spain.

References

External links 
Ribeira de Piquín page at Diputación Provincial de Lugo
Federación Galega de Municipios e Provincias

Municipalities in the Province of Lugo